Sorianello is a comune (municipality) in the Province of Vibo Valentia in the Italian region Calabria, located about  southwest of Catanzaro and about  southeast of Vibo Valentia.

Sorianello borders the following municipalities: Gerocarne, Pizzoni, Simbario, Soriano Calabro, Spadola.

Demographic evolution

References

Cities and towns in Calabria